Nico (1938–1988) was a German singer-songwriter, fashion model and actress.

Nico may also refer to:

People
 Nico (given name)
 Nico (Romanian singer) (born 1970)

Arts and entertainment
 Nico (album), a 1996 album by the group Blind Melon
 Nico (TV series), a cartoon about a blind boy
 Nico & Vinz, a Norwegian musical duo
 Nico di Angelo, a character in the books Percy Jackson & the Olympians and The Heroes of Olympus by Rick Riordan
 Nico Bellic, the main protagonist of the video game Grand Theft Auto IV
 Above the Law (film), a 1988 film known as Nico in some countries
 Shadow of the Colossus, a video game called Nico while in development

Other uses
 Nico (gorilla)
 Naftiran Intertrade (trading code "NICO"), Swiss-based subsidiary of the National Iranian Oil Company
 Neuralgia-inducing cavitational osteonecrosis, a medical condition

See also
 
 Niko (disambiguation)
 Nicolas (disambiguation)